The Neu England Rundschau (New England Review) was a weekly German language newspaper published by The German-American Publishing Company, Wisly Lithograph Company, and subsequently the Wisly-Brooks Company, Inc. of Holyoke, Massachusetts from 1883 until 1942, the longest running German newspaper in Massachusetts. A second edition of the paper was also sold in Connecticut under the masthead Connecticut Staats-Zeitung (Connecticut State Newspaper). Following scrutiny by the US Department of Justice and Office of Strategic Services of the broader German American press, as well as declining circulation, the paper ceased publication in 1942 during the Second World War.

See also
 Germans in Holyoke

Notes

References

External links
 Neu England Rundschau, May 15, 1942 issue, Internet Archive
 Neu England Rundschau (Holyoke, Mass.) 1883-1942, Library of Congress
 Institut für Auslandsbeziehungen (Institute for Foreign Relations), retains microfiche of New England Rundschau
 Hitchcock Press, Inc., letterpress printers, successor to Wisly-Brooks and the German American Publishing Company

Defunct German-language newspapers published in the United States
1883 establishments in Massachusetts
Publications disestablished in 1942
Newspapers published in Massachusetts
Mass media in Hampden County, Massachusetts
Defunct newspapers published in Massachusetts